Ralph Heathcott was Archdeacon of Totnes during 1499 .

References

Archdeacons of Totnes